Eremolaena humblotiana is a plant in the family Sarcolaenaceae. The species is endemic to Madagascar. It is named for the French naturalist Léon Humblot.

Description
Eremolaena humblotiana grows as a shrub or tree. The inflorescences bear two flowers.

Distribution and habitat
Eremolaena humblotiana is known only from the eastern regions of Alaotra-Mangoro, Analanjirofo and Atsinanana. Its habitat is humid and subhumid forest up to about  altitude.

Threats
Eremolaena humblotiana is threatened by logging, wildfires and tropical storms. Three subpopulations of the species are in protected areas: in the Betampona, Zahamena and Analalava Protected Areas of eastern Madagascar.

References

Sarcolaenaceae
Endemic flora of Madagascar
Plants described in 1884
Taxa named by Henri Ernest Baillon
Flora of the Madagascar lowland forests
Flora of the Madagascar subhumid forests